Alastor bispinosus is a species of wasp in the family Vespidae.

References

bispinosus
Insects described in 1983